DZRB (738 AM), on-air as Radyo Pilipinas (RP1), is a radio station owned and operated by the Philippine Broadcasting Service, an attached agency under the Presidential Communications Office. It serves as the flagship station of the Radyo Pilipinas network. The station's studios are located at the 4/F, PIA/Media Center Building, Visayas Ave., Brgy. Vasra, Diliman, Quezon City, and its transmitter is located at Brgy. Marulas, Valenzuela City. The station operates Weekdays from 6:00 AM to 12:00 MN and Weekends from 6:00 AM to 9:00 PM.

Established on May 8, 1933, DZRB is the first radio station in the Philippines before the launch of DZRH.

History
On May 8, 1933, the United States-sponsored Insular Government established and operated radio station KZSO in the Philippines on the frequency of 710 kilohertz with a power of 10,000 watts through the United States Information Service. In 1944, the callsign was change to KZFM, named after Frederick Marquardt.

In September 1946, two months after the Philippines became an independent country from the US, KZFM was turned over to the Philippine government. With the transfer, the Philippine Broadcasting Service was born (the second broadcasting organization in the Philippines after Metropolitan Broadcasting Company).

The station was first operated by the Department of Foreign Affairs until it was transferred to the Radio Broadcasting Board (RBB) which was created by President Manuel Quezon on September 3, 1937. Meanwhile, in the same year, an international telecommunications conference in Atlantic City, New Jersey, reassigned the letter "D" to replace the former "K" as the initial call letter for all radio stations in the Philippines. In January  1942, the RBB was abolished to give way to the establishment of the Philippine Information Council (PIC) which then assumed the function of the RBB, including the operation of DZFM. In turn, the PIC was abolished on July 1, 1952, and since then, until the creation of the Department of Public Information (DPI) in 1959, DZFM and the Philippine Broadcasting Service (PBS) had been operated under the Office of the President.

During Martial Law, the Bureau of Broadcasts took over the station and became DPI Radio 1 / MPI Radio 1. In November 1978, due to the switch of the Philippine AM dial from the NARBA-mandated 10 kHz spacing to the 9 kHz rule implemented by the Geneva Frequency Plan of 1975, the station's frequency was transferred from 710 kHz to 918 kHz.

In 1986 (after the EDSA Revolution), DZFM returned to its ownership by the establishment of the Bureau of Broadcast Services via the reinstated PBS.

The station would later be reformatted as Sports Radio (the predecessor of Radyo Pilipinas 2).

On January 2, 1995, Presidential Order No. 293 ordered the transfer of Sports Radio to 918 kHz, which led to the birth of the government's flagship station: Radyo ng Bayan (People's Radio) and it also transferred to 738 kHz frequency.

During his first State of the Nation Address, then-President Rodrigo Duterte announced he would support a law merging PBS with its TV counterpart, People's Television Network, into the "People's Broadcasting Corporation (PBC)".

PBS announced that Radyo ng Bayan & its provincial AM stations will undergo a major rebranding, merging with the "Radyo Pilipinas" brand by June 5, 2017. It was followed by the launching of Radyo Pilipinas Dos 918 kHz on September 18, 2017. Radyo Pilipinas's overseas counterpart (DZRP), which originally used the brand since the 1990s, remained on air but added "Worldwide" to avert confusion.

On May 5, 2018, Radyo Pilipinas' "TeleRadyo"-formatted video streaming channel began its simulcast over People's Television Network (PTV) nationwide and also streamed live via PTV's official Facebook account, with programs such as Cabinet Report sa TeleRadyo (airing every Friday) and Tutok Erwin Tulfo (airing from Mondays to Fridays). However, a few weeks later, both programs were cancelled in favor of infomercial programming as a preparation for the launch of Chinese TV programs on PTV until it was eventually cancelled in 2019.

Platform
As the government's flagship radio station, it serves as a medium of development communication, a conduit between the government and the people, aiming to mobilize all sectors of society towards development and nationalism; the station features live, up-to-the-minute government news, live coverages of press conferences, as well as relevant information from different government sectors.

Notable personalities
 Erwin Tulfo
 Ben Tulfo
 Alex Santos

Programming

See also 
 DWGT-TV
 People's Television Network

References

External links
Media Ownership Monitor Philippines  - Radio by VERA Files and Reporters Without Borders

Radio stations in Metro Manila
Radio stations established in 1933
News and talk radio stations in the Philippines
Philippine Broadcasting Service
People's Television Network
Radyo Pilipinas